Alexander Morton (1844–1923) was a Scottish textiles manufacturer.

In 1875, he founded Alexander Morton and Company in Darvel, Ayrshire. In the 1890s, they had nearly 600 employees. By 1900, they had expanded to Carlisle, England and Killybegs, Ireland (Donegal Carpets).

They used the services of many designers, especially C. F. A. Voysey, Heywood Sumner and Lindsay Butterfield, and later Cecil Millar and George Henry Walton.

In 1914, he reorganised his business interests, with a new company Morton Sundour being "the major off-shoot". It was run by his second son James Morton.

The Victoria and Albert Museum, London holds 774 examples of their fabrics in their collection.

References

1844 births
1923 deaths
Textile manufacturers of Scotland
Textile manufacturers of England
Scottish company founders